The Whiteface River is a  tributary of the Saint Louis River in Saint Louis County, Minnesota, United States.

It begins at the outlet of Whiteface Reservoir near Markham and flows southwest, joining the Saint Louis River northeast of the city of Floodwood.

The river is used for recreational paddling. Users should be aware there are no formal bathroom facilities along the river.

See also
List of rivers of Minnesota
List of longest streams of Minnesota

References

External links
Minnesota Watersheds
USGS Hydrologic Unit Map - State of Minnesota (1974)

Rivers of Minnesota
Rivers of St. Louis County, Minnesota